ipfirewall or ipfw is a FreeBSD IP, stateful firewall, packet filter and traffic accounting facility. Its ruleset logic is similar to many other packet filters except IPFilter. ipfw is authored and maintained by FreeBSD volunteer staff members. Its syntax enables use of sophisticated filtering capabilities and thus enables users to satisfy advanced requirements. It can either be used as a loadable kernel module or incorporated into the kernel; use as a loadable kernel module where possible is highly recommended. ipfw was the built-in firewall of Mac OS X until Mac OS X 10.7 Lion in 2011 when it was replaced with the OpenBSD project's PF.  Like FreeBSD, ipfw is open source. It is used in many FreeBSD-based firewall products, including m0n0wall and FreeNAS.
A port of an early version of ipfw was used since Linux 1.1 as the first implementation of firewall available for Linux, until it was replaced by ipchains.
A modern port of ipfw and the dummynet traffic shaper is available for Linux (including a prebuilt package for OpenWrt) and Microsoft Windows. wipfw is a Windows port of an old (2001) version of ipfw.

Alternative user interfaces for ipfw

See also

netfilter/iptables, a Linux-based descendant of ipchains
NPF, a NetBSD packet filter
PF, another widely deployed BSD firewall solution

References

External links
 ipfw section of the FreeBSD Handbook.
 The dummynet project - including versions for Linux, OpenWrt and Windows
 wipfw Windows port of an old (2001) version of ipfw

Firewall software
BSD software